Alma Mater Iowa is the alma mater hymn for the University of Iowa.

The lyrics were written by Gene Mills - a graduate of the university's College of Engineering in 1947 and the melody was composed in 1960

Lyrics

References 

University of Iowa
Alma mater songs
Songs about Iowa
American college songs
1960 songs